Let Me Be a Woman is the third album by American experimental rock band Oxbow, recorded in 1993 and first released in 1995 through Brinkman Records.

Track listing

Personnel 
Oxbow
Dan Adams – bass guitar
Tom Dobrov – drums, percussion
Eugene S. Robinson – vocals
Niko Wenner – guitars, piano, Hammond organ, production, recording
Additional personnel
Steve Albini – recording
Kathy Acker – spoken word (7, 8)
Claudia Herzog – violin
Jorjee – vocals
Sanxe Lovxa – vocals
Jon Raskin – saxophone
Alicia J. Rose – accordion
Cintra Wilson – piano
Roderick Wyllie – reed organ
Jim Blanchard – artwork
Britta Höper – artwork, design

References

External links
 

1995 albums
Albums produced by Steve Albini
Oxbow (band) albums